Loughran is a surname which may refer to: 

Angus Loughran (born 1966), British sports commentator and pundit
Beatrix Loughran (1900–1975), American figure skater
Bill Loughran (1862–1917), American baseball player
 Cara Loughran (2003–2018), one of the 17 victims who was killed in the Stoneman Douglas High School shooting
Eamonn Loughran (born 1970), Northern Irish boxer
Frank Loughran (1931–2008), Australian footballer
Harry Loughran (born 1990s), Irish Gaelic footballer
James Loughran (born 1931), British conductor
James N. Loughran (1940–2006), American Jesuit
Jimmy Loughran (1897–1970), English footballer
Joe Loughran (1915–1994), English footballer
John T. Loughran (1889–1953), American lawyer and politician
Jonathan Loughran (born 1966), American actor
Marco Loughran (born 1989), British swimmer
Matt Loughran, American guitarist
Nate Loughran, American mixed martial artist
Paul Loughran (born 1969), Northern Irish actor
Peter Loughran (born 1940), Australian rules footballer
PJ Loughran (born 1973), American illustrator, musician and entrepreneur
Thomas P. Loughran Jr., American physician scientist
Tommy Loughran (1902–1982), American professional boxer